Overwatch and Overwatch 2 are team-based first-person shooter games developed by Blizzard Entertainment. Overwatch was released in May 2016 for several platforms. The game features a number of gameplay modes that support casual play, ranked play, and competitive modes used for professional esports events, such as the Overwatch League. Overwatch 2 was released in October 2022 with the same player versus player (PvP) modes, and will later include new player versus environment (PvE) co-operative multiplayer modes.

Fundamentals
Unless otherwise noted, all gameplay features apply to both Overwatch games.
Overwatch features squad-based combat with two opposing teams of six players each, while Overwatch 2 uses five-on-five teams. Players choose one of thirty-two hero characters, each with their own unique abilities and role classes. The three character roles include: damage characters that have powerful attacks to lead attacks or defend control points and choke points, support characters that provide buffs and debuffs for their allies and enemies respectively (such as healing or speed alterations), and tank characters that have a large amount of armor and hit points to withstand enemy attacks and draw fire away from teammates. During the pre-match setup, players on a team will be given advice from the game if their team is unbalanced, such as if they are lacking defensive heroes, encouraging players to switch to other heroes pre-match and balance the starting team. Within a match, players can switch between characters in-game following deaths or by returning to their home base. The game is designed to encourage players to adapt to the opposing team during a match by switching to characters that better "counter" their abilities. As part of a major update across both regular players of Overwatch and Overwatch esports leagues to launch in September 2019, Blizzard introduced a "Role Queue" for quick play and competitive modes, requiring the player to select one of damage, support, or tank roles for the duration of a game, though freely able to switch between heroes in that role, so that in matchmaking, teams will be made up of two of each roles. From February through June 2020, Blizzard ran its competitive seasons using a "hero pool" mechanic, where only a selection of heroes will be available to play each week similar to League of Legends, to evaluate using it in the long term. However, after this point, Blizzard found that the hero pool approach was not necessary to maintain balance for characters, instead being able to use other modes, such as an experimental card mode, to test balance adjustments that were later brought to the main game, and dropped the hero pool approach save for the Overwatch League.

Each hero has a primary ability and at least two additional abilities that can be invoked at any time, some requiring a brief cooldown period before they can be used again. Furthermore, each player slowly builds up a meter towards their character's "ultimate" ability; this meter builds up over time but can build up faster for defeating opponents or performing other beneficial tasks for their team such as healing other team members. Once ready, the player can use this ability at any time which may last for a few seconds (such as increased attack strength or immunity to attacks) or be a single powerful action (such as throwing a small explosive), after which they then must wait for the meter to fill up again. Opposing players will be alerted to the use of this ultimate ability by an exclamation from the character, often in the character's native language; for example, when using his "Deadeye" ability gunslinger Cassidy will call out "It's high noon" as the player engages the ultimate ability to target multiple visible enemies and deal lethal damage to those still in sight. This gives opposing players a brief moment to try to take cover or respond appropriately.

A second meter tracks how many in-round points a player has scored over time, which are rewarded for killing or assisting in killing, providing team defense or healing, and scoring objective points. When a certain threshold is reached, the player character's icon will be "on fire," representing that that character is a threat, but otherwise does not directly affect gameplay. This meter will slowly drop if the player does not continue to score points.

Overwatch employs an automated instant replay system, designed to highlight important moments of the game. After the game's end, the server selects a fragment of the match which had a large impact on the game's progression, such as a rapid succession of kills or an effective use of team healing, and then broadcasts it to all players from the point of view of the player responsible for it. This is called a "Play of the Game" (often abbreviated to "PotG"), or "Play of the Match" ("PotM") in competitive games that have longer matches. Afterwards, a result screen is shown, highlighting up to four individual players from both teams for their achievements during the match (such as damage dealt, healed or blocked, or time spent on the objective), and all players are given the option to commend one of them. Following a June 2018 patch, players can also give out up to three endorsements to any other player in the match based on leadership, teamwork, or sportsmanship. Such endorsements boost experience gained by the receiving players, and factors into matchmaking, favoring players that continue to get endorsements. A custom replay system, automatically storing a player's last ten games in each game mode and with numerous camera and positioning features, was introduced into the "Public Test Region" (PTR), a special set of servers where upcoming patches can be tested by any player, in May 2019, and released for all servers in June 2019.

Players gain experience points following a match towards a metagame level based on several factors such as whether they won or lost, how effectively they used their character's powers, being awarded gold, silver, or bronze medals for their team across six categories such as most time spent on the objectives; and beating past personal records in these categories. Initially, experience was only awarded when playing the game's matchmaking modes and not custom games, but the custom server browser update, released in February 2017, enabled experience gains for custom games. Each experience level earns a player a loot box, which contain four random cosmetic items for individual heroes, including victory poses, paint sprays, alternate skins (costumes), emotes and voice lines. Items are given out based on their rarity level, with "Common", "Epic", and "Legendary" tiers. Loot boxes may contain in-game currency called "credits", which can be used to purchase specific cosmetic items directly, with their cost based on the item's rarity. Duplicate items are rewarded with in-game currency. Other items can only be acquired by completing in-game achievements. Players have the option to buy loot boxes with real-world money through microtransactions.

Character roles

Characters in Overwatch come in three varieties: Damage, Tank, and Support. These roles serve to categorize the heroes by similar characteristics that can be used to describe them and their play style. If playing in an “open-queue” game-mode, the game shows tips to the players depending on which heroes have been selected; e.g., the team will recommend that a player selects a Support hero if there are none on the team.
 Damage: Damage characters include those that have high mobility and are known for their ability to deal large amounts of damage though are highly vulnerable, and those that excel at protecting specific locations and creating choke points, often by providing field support units such as sentry turrets and traps.
 Tank: Tank characters have many more hit points compared to other characters. They are able to draw enemy fire away from their teammates to themselves, disrupting the enemy team. Tank heroes have various ways to protect themselves and their team with shield-like abilities.
 Support: Support characters are utility characters that have abilities that enhance their own team or weaken their enemies. They do not deal a lot of damage, nor do they have many hit points, but the buffs and debuffs they provide aid teammates in eliminating their opponents.

Player-versus-Player map types
In standard and competitive play, and in some of the special Arcade modes, maps are randomly selected for the match. Each Overwatch map has a specific game mode that it supports, which include:
 Assault: (also known as 2 Capture Points or 2CP) The attacking team is tasked with capturing two target points in sequence on the map, while the defending team must stop them. Assault-style maps will be removed from main gameplay rotation when Overwatch 2 is released while still available in custom game modes, though Blizzard developers plan to reintroduce the maps in other modes at a later time.
 Escort: The attacking team is tasked with escorting a payload to a certain delivery point before time runs out, while the defending team must stop them. The payload vehicle moves along a fixed track when any player on the attacking team is close to it, but will stop if a defending player is nearby; should no attacker be near the vehicle, it will start to move backwards along the track. Passing specific checkpoints will extend the match time and prevent the payload from moving backwards from that point.
 Hybrid (Assault/Escort): The attacking team has to capture the payload (as if it were a target point from Assault) and escort it to its destination, while the defending team tries to hold them back.
 Control: Each team tries to capture and maintain a common control point until their capture percentage reaches 100%. This game mode is played in a best-of-three format. Control maps are laid out in a symmetric fashion so no team has an intrinsic position advantage.
 Push: (introduced in Overwatch 2) Each team attempts to secure control of a large robot that pushes one of two payload to the opposing team's side of the map while under the team's control. The team that pushes the payload fully to the other side, or the farthest into the enemy territory, wins the match.

Each mode includes an "overtime" period that gives the attacking team additional time to complete an objective once normal time expires, as long as at least one member of the attacking team is actively on or near the objective throughout the overtime period. The attacking team has a brief period of time to return to the objective if they leave or are knocked away from it, with that grace time diminishing as overtime proceeds.

Other game maps exist in the game's Arcade modes or can be created through custom games. These include:
 Elimination: First introduced in November 2016, two teams face off in a series of rounds, attempting to wipe out the other team; once a player is killed they remain out of the game until the next round though can be resurrected. If no team has won a round by a certain time, then the round is decided by the team that can first take a neutral control point. Players cannot change heroes until the next round. Some of these can be played in "lockout" mode, in which the heroes selected by the winning team for a round are "locked" and cannot be selected in future rounds.
 Deathmatch: Played either free-for-all or in two teams, players seek to kill opponents, scoring for each kill they make, and respawning a few moments later if they die. Matches are played until one player or team obtains a pre-set score. Deathmatch was introduced in August 2017.
 Capture the Flag: Introduced in February 2017, Capture the Flag is played on any of the symmetrical Control maps. Teams must attempt to capture the opponent's team flag while protecting their own. To account for the differences in hero movement and abilities, one must stand atop the flag for a few seconds to either capture or return the flag. Further, the flag carrier will drop the flag if they use any of their active skills, preventing heroes that possess fast movement skills from overwhelming play. Matches are played for 5 minutes or until one team has scored three captures.

The custom server options enable players to create additional game modes not readily classified under the existing modes; for example, players can create 6 versus 1 settings, where one team must try to defeat a single player who is significantly overpowered compared to standard characters.

Player-versus-Environment map types
Overwatch 2 will introduce cooperative player-versus-environmental missions where four players work against computer-controlled opponents. There are two main types of these missions:
 Story: where players in teams of four recreate key missions by the Overwatch forces during the Omnic wars. These are similar to the special Archive missions in the seasonal events. Players will only be able to select from a limited set of heroes, but these modes will include special items that will be randomly distributed on the map, similar to a battle royale game, to change up how each playthrough occurs.
 Hero: where players will take on missions to protect cities from Omnic, Talon and other nefarious forces but otherwise unrelated to the overall story. In this mode, players will be able to gain experience to level up their characters and unlock passive abilities that affect the character's base skill kit.

Maps
Overwatch was released with 12 maps, but new maps have been added over time. Like new heroes, these maps are usually introduced first within the Public Test Region (PTR), allowing players to opt-in to help test and provide feedback on the maps. Once Blizzard feels the map is ready, it is then added to all gameplay regions, entering into normal casual map rotation and often featured in a special Arcade mode for a week or so. New maps are not introduced immediately into competitive mode; though Blizzard had previously waited until the completion of a competitive mode season to introduce a map, as of May 2018 they now plan to add new maps into the competitive mode rotation two weeks following their global introduction into casual play.

The maps are typically designed to support portions of the Overwatch narrative, which follows from thirty years after a robotic uprising, the Omnic Crisis, occurred in Earth's near future. The crisis was resolved by the Overwatch agency, which afterward was disbanded. In the game's present, with a threat of another Omnic Crisis and appearance of several shadowy groups, the members of Overwatch have rejoined forces. Most of the game's maps are inspired by real-world locations. The first four maps, "King's Row", "Hanamura", "Temple of Anubis", and "Ilios" are inspired by London, Japan, the ruins of Ancient Egypt, and Greece respectively. During seasonal events, certain maps may be redecorated for the event's theme, but otherwise retain the fundamental layouts, such as Halloween updates for the Hollywood and Eichenwald maps during the "Halloween Terror" events.

Starting in November 2019, Blizzard implemented a map pool that limits the number of available maps in each mode for competitive play (and which also applied to the professional competitions like Overwatch League). This allows Blizzard to curate maps that are not presently in the pool based on player feedback and other observations without disrupting the competitive seasons. These maps otherwise remain available for the various Quickplay and Arcade options.

Assault maps
Overwatch shipped with three Assault maps, with two additional Assault map added since release.
 Hanamura: Based on a Japan setting, the map includes the ancestral home of the Shimada crime family, which heroes Hanzo and Genji are heirs.
 Temple of Anubis: Set in the ruins of Ancient Egypt, the Temple of Anubis houses a quarantine area for the Anubis artificial intelligence, believed to have been part of the Omnic Uprising. The map itself was originally developed as part of Blizzard's cancelled Titan project, and re-purposed for Overwatch.
 Volskaya Industries: This map is set in a St. Petersburg Omnic factory, where the start of the second Omnic Crisis has started.
 Horizon Lunar Colony: Introduced to the game in June 2017, Horizon Lunar Colony takes place on a scientific complex built on the Moon, where the gorilla hero Winston was raised and given intelligence alongside other test gorilla subjects. The map was designed to have a strong story hook, using several visual elements that related to the sudden revolt of the gorillas that killed the scientists. The map initially was to take place fully under low gravity conditions, but on testing Blizzard found this did not work well, but left one section of the map that featured low gravity.
 Paris: Introduced in the test servers in January 2019 and formally released for all on February 19, 2019, the map is based on the narrow streets and alleys of Paris along the Seine River, featuring elements like cabaret clubs.

Escort maps
Overwatch shipped with three Escort maps and since added three additional ones.
 Dorado: Set in Mexico, the map has players escort a component of a new clean fusion power plant. The map includes references to the Los Muertos criminal gang, and included many early references to the Sombra character well before she was announced as a character. In developing the map, the artists had found a picture online of colorful homes ascending a hillside presumably in Mexico which they used for reference, but later discovered that the photograph was of Manarola, Italy. This discovery did not change their design approach to the map.
 Route 66: This map is set on a portion of the old Route 66 in the United States, and sees players escorting a bomb taken from a train heist to the Deadlock gang's base, of which hero Cassidy was a former member.
 Watchpoint: Gibraltar: Set on the Rock of Gibraltar, the map has the attacking team escort a satellite drone vehicle from a decommissioned Overwatch base to a rocket as to launch it into space.
 Junkertown: This map was introduced in August 2017. It features the makeshift city of Junkertown, from which both Junkrat and Roadhog had been evicted from by Junker Queen. The map sees the attacking team escort a decoy treasure trove into Junkertown and to its vaults as to steal the rest of the money from the vaults.
 Rialto: Set in the canal-laden Rialto area of Venice, the map was first introduced as a player-versus-environment map in the seasonal event, Overwatch Retribution, during April 2018, and re-added as an Escort map as part of the game's normal rotation in May 2018.
 Havana: The map through the Cuban city was introduced in April 2019 as part of the "Storm Rising" co-operative mode. In the Escort version, the attacking team escorts an illicit shipment of rum to the nearby docks and protect it from the defending team. The Escort version added the same week to the PTR, and released to all servers at the conclusion of the event in May 2019.

Hybrid maps
Overwatch shipped with three Hybrid maps and has added two since.
 Hollywood: Set around a movie studio in Hollywood, California, the attacks secure Omnic filmmaker Hal-Fred Glitchbot's limo and escort it to his trailer. Because most of Blizzard's artists lived in the Los Angeles area and were readily familiar with Hollywood, Blizzard tasked the design of this map to non-Americans, instructing them to create it based on their impressions of what Hollywood represented rather than accuracy.
 King's Row: Set in London following the first Omnic uprising, the map is based on securing and taking an electromagnetic pulse bomb to the Underworld, where the Omnics have been forced to live since the uprising. The map was also re-purposed for the "Overwatch Archives: Uprising" seasonal event into a player versus environment map that has players attempt to stop the Omnics during the first uprising. 
 Numbani: The map is set in a city in the country of same name. The map was featured in the initial promotional media for Overwatch, and was central to the introduction of both the Orisa and Doomfist characters. Initially, prior to Doomfist's introduction as a playable character, the map saw players escorting Doomfist's gauntlet to a museum. Just before Orisa and Doomfist were announced as playable characters, the map was changed to reflect a large attack against Omnic security forces and the theft of the gauntlet from the payload, both elements leading into the narrative of the introduction of these characters. The map, since this point, reflects the damage left by the attack, but now players escort an unknown object to the museum.
 Eichenwalde: Taking place in the ruins of a German castle, Eichenwalde was the first new map added to Overwatch following its release, in August 2016. The castle was the last stand of the lead Crusader and Reinhardt's mentor, Balderich von Alder, during a large Omnic attack. Players secure and escort a battering ram to break into the castle and locate von Alder's remains.
 Blizzard World: The map, introduced in January 2018, is set in a fictional theme park that is a tribute to other Blizzard properties, including World of Warcraft, Hearthstone, and StarCraft.

Control maps
Three control maps were shipped with Overwatch and two have been added since.
 Ilios: The map is set on a Grecian resort island, modeled after the island of Santorini.
 Nepal: The map is set in an Omnic monastery in Nepal.
 Lijiang Tower: The map is set on the riverside of Lijiang, China, around the headquarters of the Lucheng Interstellar space agency.
 Oasis: The map is set in a fictional university in Iraq, and was introduced in January 2017. Blizzard's Jeff Kaplan noted that while Iraq settings have been frequently featured in video games before, it is usually based on a war-torn setting, and for Overwatch, they wanted to show something different and made the map to give the sense of a technically advanced, pristine city.
 Busan: This map is based on the city of Busan, South Korea, the home town of hero D.Va. The map was first announced in August 2018 alongside the first Korean Overwatch fan festival, and playable on the PTR that same day, and ultimately added to all servers by mid-September 2018. Jeff Kaplan stated that they wanted the map to feel authentic to the city, and spent time recording sounds of the real Busan to augment their own sound effects, as well as finding Busan musicians to help provide background music for the level.
 Antartic Peninsula: The map is based off of the climate research facility that the hero Mei works in.

Push maps
Push mode maps were introduced with the launch of Overwatch 2.
Esperança Set in a town in Portugal, designed to be mostly symmetric to support the Push mode.

Arena maps
Arena maps were added to Overwatch to support various causal game modes, in particular matches featuring three-versus-three players but can be re-purposed for other modes. These maps are much smaller in effective area than other gameplay modes.
 Ecopoint: Antarctica: Ecopoint was the first Arena map added in November 2016, alongside the game's revision of its Arcade modes. It features a scientific outpost in Antarctica where hero Mei was stationed at.
 Castillo: This map was introduced along with two others in May 2017 as part of the first anniversary of the game. It is a Mexican town near the location where the Dorado map takes place, and heavily ties into Sombra and Cassidy's backstories. 
 Black Forest: Also introduced in May 2017, the Black Forest map is located near Eichenwalde castle.
 Necropolis: Also introduced in May 2017, the Necropolis map is located near the same site as the Temple of Anubis.

Other maps
These are maps that have been added to support specific gameplay modes not otherwise identified above.
 Chateau Guillard: This map represents the family home of Widowmaker, and is set in a lake in France. The map was introduced along with the addition of Deathmatch support in August 2017. It is designed to support non-team Deathmatch modes.
 Ayutthaya: This map, designed after a Thailand temple, was added in February 2018 to support Capture-the-Flag.
 Petra: Introduced in May 2018 as part of the game's 2nd anniversary, Petra is a map designed for Deathmatch. It takes place in an archaeological site of Egyptian ruins, and features a number of environmental hazards players can use against each other, including a collapsible floor that opens onto a bottomless pit.
 Kanezaka: Introduced in January 2021 as an additional deathmatch map, Kanezaka is based in Tokyo, Japan.
 Malevento: This deathmatch map was introduced in September 2021. It is based on Talon's headquarters in Italy.

Game modes
Overwatch features several means of gameplay, including tutorials and practice modes against computer-controlled opponents, casual matchmaking, weekly brawls, custom games, and competitive play. Overwatch allows players to group up prior to starting most of the team modes with friends, or can join a group after finishing a match. With a June 2018 patch, Overwatch also allows players create open groups based on certain requirements, such as fixed character roles or desired gameplay type, with other players able to find such groups via the same criteria.

Casual modes
Casual matchmaking (also known as Quick play) allows players, alone, or in a party with invited friends, to be randomly matched against others in Quickplay mode. The game servers will attempt to match the gathered players in party via a dynamic queue with others based on general skill level, only broadening outside this search range if it takes a long time to find matching players. With the "Role Queue" update in September 2019, players will need to queue up in one of the three roles or form groups that do not exceed these roles before starting a match, while a new "Quickplay Classic" Arcade mode will be added without the role locking requirements. Blizzard works to adjust this matchmaking approach to making sure players will find matches of people with roughly equivalent skill level. For example, in June 2016, Blizzard removed the option for players to avoid specific opponents; the option was meant for players to be able ignore trolls, but instead found that highly skilled players were being put on these avoidance lists and were having difficulty finding games or would be matched with new and less-skilled players.

Overwatch was launched with a rotating Weekly Brawl mode, inspired by Hearthstones Tavern Brawls. These matches featured unique rules, such as players forced to play a specific hero or a specific class of hero, or may force a random hero on the player each time they respawn; as the mode's name suggests, these Brawls would change weekly. The Weekly Brawl was merged into an Arcade mode on November 15, 2016. Arcade mode features a rotating variety of games based on all game modes, and from which players can earn unique in-game items or loot boxes. During seasonal events, these Arcade modes may feature unique game modes for that event, such as a three-on-three soccer-type game during the 2016 Summer Olympics, a co-operative player-versus-environment defense mode during the game's first Halloween event Junkenstein's Revenge, and a Capture the Flag mode as part of the 2017 Chinese New Year event.

Custom games enable players to have open or private games with several possible options that can be adjusted, such as match length, which maps to play, limitations on character selection, and similar options that are used to create the Weekly Brawl or Arcade matches. An update first released in April 2019 introduced the Workshop, a means to use similar scripting tools that Blizzard has available to further customize game options or modify how heroes work in custom games. When initially released, custom games did not allow players to gain experience points. Blizzard has since allowed experience to be earned in custom games with safeguards to prevent players idling for experience points.

Competitive mode
Competitive mode allows players segregated by both region and platform to play in ranked matches to try to advance in their skill ranking (SR) as high as possible during 2-to-3 month long competitive seasons. Competitive matches uses the same rules as the professional Overwatch League. Prior to the September 2019 "Role Queue" update, players must play 10 matches at the start of a new season to determine their skill ranking, a combination of their win/loss/draw record, their previous season's performance, and their own performance with the various heroes over the 10 matches. Following the "Role Queue" update, players get three separate skill ranking for each of the three roles, and only require 5 games in that role at the start of the season to quantify the skill rating for that role.

Once a player has a skill ranking, all competitive matches are played using matchmaking with players near similar skill levels, and one's skill ranking will rise or fall upon winning or losing a match, respectively; draws do not affect the skill ranking. One's skill ranking determines which of six tiers they are in, with end-of-season rewards given out based on the highest tier that one achieved that season. Those in the highest tiers, Master and Grandmaster, must continue to play matches to maintain their position within those tiers or will have their skill rank drop if they are inactive. Winning or drawing a match earns players "competitive points", a separate form of in-game currency that can be used to buy "golden weapons" for a selected hero. Blizzard continues to monitor how competitive play works out and has tweaked various aspects of the system throughout seasons in response to player feedback.

Overwatchs normal competitive mode is limited to the map types of Control, Assault, Escort, and Hybrid. Control maps are played in a best-of-three matchup, with teams vying to take a central control point. Once a team takes control of a point, by clearing all opponents from the point for a short period of time, they must defend the point as their percentage of control of the point slowly increases towards 100%. If the opposing team can clear the defenders and keep the point clear, they then take control, though the original team retains its percentage of control it had. Once a team reaches 99% of the control needed, they must clear the opposing team from the point to complete 100% capture and take the round.

The other three map types, Assault, Escort, and Hybrid, are based on one team attacking to take control points and/or move a payload through checkpoints within a limited amount of time, while the other team defends against these. Games on these maps are played in at least two rounds, with teams switching roles between the attacking and defending teams between these rounds. One team is randomly selected to start as the attacking team, and is scored based on how many checkpoints they have captured/passed and if they cannot completely capture the next checkpoint or escort the payload, how close they were to their next objective. This latter is based on the maximum percentage of control they had of the control point or the farthest the payload was moved; however, teams must take at least one-third of a control point to get credit for that, otherwise their score is treated as if they had not taken any of it. If the team successfully completes all objectives, then the time remaining (the "time bank") is recorded.

In the second round, the attacking and defending teams' roles are switched. If the first attacking team completed all objectives, the second team must do so as well to at least tie up the match. Otherwise, the new attacking team is shown the score they must beat via the game's interface and on the map. If they succeed, they win the match, and failure to at least match that score is a loss. If both teams end up with the same score but with no time remaining in their time banks, the match is considered a draw. Otherwise, additional sudden death matches are played to try to break the tie. The tiebreaker rules depend on the map type, but generally, these have each team have an opportunity to play as the attacking team, starting with what time remains in their time bank, to attempt to get the best score possible; in these sudden death rounds, no time bonus is granted when reaching any checkpoint. Multiple series of sudden death rounds may be needed if both teams succeed in completing all objectives while still having time remaining.

Overwatch has run short-term competitive seasons for other game modes typically as part of the seasonal events. This has included Lucioball, Capture the Flag, Deathmatch, Team Deathmatch, and Elimination. The approach to these are similar as with normal competitive modes, requiring players to complete ten matches to gain a ranking, which is then used for future matchmaking and can be increased or decreased based on the outcome of a match.

Notes

References

External links

Overwatch (video game)
Overwatch